In aeronautics, a spoiler (sometimes called a lift spoiler or lift dumper) is a device which intentionally reduces the  lift component  of an airfoil in a controlled way. Most often, spoilers are plates on the top surface of a wing that can be extended upward into the airflow to spoil the streamline flow. By so doing, the spoiler creates a controlled stall over the portion of the wing behind it, greatly reducing the lift of that wing section. Spoilers differ from airbrakes in that airbrakes are designed to increase drag without disrupting the lift distribution across the wing span, while spoilers disrupt the lift distribution as well as increasing drag.

Spoilers fall into two categories: those that are deployed at controlled angles during flight to increase descent rate or control roll, and those that are fully deployed immediately on landing to greatly reduce lift ("lift dumpers") and increase drag. In modern fly-by-wire aircraft, the same set of control surfaces serve both functions.

Spoilers were used by most gliders (sailplanes) until the 1960s to control their rate of descent and thus achieve a controlled landing.  Since then, spoilers on gliders have almost entirely been replaced by airbrakes, usually of the Schempp-Hirth type. Spoilers and airbrakes enable the glide angle to be altered during the approach while leaving the speed unchanged.

Airliners are almost always fitted with spoilers. Spoilers are used to increase descent rate without increasing speed. Their use is often limited, however, as the turbulent airflow that develops behind them causes noise and vibration, which may cause discomfort to passengers. Spoilers may also be differentially operated for roll control instead of ailerons; Martin Aircraft was the first company to develop such spoilers in 1948. On landing, however, the spoilers are nearly always fully deployed to help slow the aircraft. The increase in form drag created by the spoilers directly assists the braking effect. However, the most gain comes as the spoilers cause a dramatic loss of lift and hence the weight of the aircraft is transferred from the wings to the undercarriage, allowing the wheels to be mechanically braked with less tendency to skid.

In air-cooled piston engine aircraft, spoilers may be needed to avoid shock cooling the engines. In a descent without spoilers, air speed is increased and the engine will be at low power, producing less heat than normal. The engine may cool too rapidly, resulting in stuck valves, cracked cylinders or other problems. Spoilers alleviate the situation by allowing the aircraft to descend at a desired rate while letting the engine run at a power setting that keeps it from cooling too quickly (especially true for turbocharged piston engines, which generate higher temperatures than normally aspirated engines).

Spoiler controls
Spoiler controls can be used for roll control (outboard or mid-span spoilers) or descent control (inboard spoilers).

Some aircraft use spoilers in combination with or in lieu of ailerons for roll control, primarily to reduce adverse yaw when rudder input is limited by higher speeds. For such spoilers the term spoileron has been coined. In the case of a spoileron, in order for it to be used as a control surface, it is raised on one wing only, thus decreasing lift and increasing drag, causing roll and yaw. Eliminating dedicated ailerons also avoids the problem of control reversal and allows flaps to occupy a greater portion of the wing trailing edge.

Almost all modern jet airliners are fitted with inboard lift spoilers which are used together during descent to increase the rate of descent and control speed. Some aircraft use lift spoilers on landing approach to control descent without changing the aircraft's attitude.

One jet airliner not fitted with lift spoilers was the Douglas DC-8 which used reverse thrust in flight on the two inboard engines to control descent speed (however the aircraft was fitted with lift dumpers). The Lockheed Tristar was fitted with a system called Direct Lift Control that used the spoilers on landing approach to control descent.

Airbus aircraft with fly-by-wire control utilise wide-span spoilers for descent control, spoilerons, gust alleviation, and lift dumpers. Especially on landing approach, the full width of spoilers can be seen controlling the aircraft's descent rate and bank.

Lift dumpers
Lift dumpers are a special type of spoiler extending along much of the wing's length and designed to dump as much lift as possible on landing. Lift dumpers have only two positions, deployed and retracted. Lift dumpers have three main functions: putting most of the weight of the aircraft on the wheels for maximum braking effect, increasing form drag, and preventing aircraft 'bounce' on landing.

Lift dumpers are almost always deployed automatically on touch down. The flight deck control has three positions: off, automatic ('armed'), and manual (rarely used). On landing approach 'automatic' is selected and, on touchdown, a sensor called a weight-on-wheels switch signals the lift dumpers to be raised. The flight control spoilers are also raised as additional lift dumpers.

Virtually all modern jet aircraft are fitted with lift dumpers. The British Aerospace 146 is fitted with particularly wide-span spoilers to generate additional drag and make reverse thrust unnecessary.

A number of accidents have been caused either by inadvertently deploying lift dumpers on landing approach, or forgetting to set them to 'automatic'.

Incidents and accidents
 Air Canada Flight 621 – Premature deployment of the spoilers at low altitude contributed to this crash in Toronto on 5 July 1970.
United Airlines Flight 553 – Forgetting to deactivate the spoilers contributed to  crash at Chicago Midway International Airport on 8 December 1972.
Loftleiðir Icelandic Airlines Flight 509  – Deployment of lift dumpers while attempting to arm them 40 feet above the runway caused this accident at John F. Kennedy International Airport on 23 June 1973.
American Airlines Flight 965 – Forgetting to deactivate the spoilers while climbing to avoid a mountain contributed to this crash on 20 December 1995.
American Airlines Flight 1420 – Forgetting to deploy the spoilers contributed to this crash at Little Rock National Airport on 1 June 1999.
Atlantic Airways Flight 670 – The spoilers did not deploy during landing on a fairly short wet runway, causing overrun and falling over a cliff, on 10 October 2006.
TAM Airlines Flight 3054 – This Airbus A320's pilots were aware of their deactivated starboard engine #2 thrust reverser, and so apparently did not attempt to use it to brake when attempting to land at São Paulo's Congonhas Airport on 17 July 2007; under one theory of the cause, they used an old procedure, which reduced the required runway length for landing but was superseded because it invited pilot error, which required them to leave the engine in idle rather than reverse thrust, and mistakenly left the engine at full power. The plane's spoilers may have been their only method of braking at speed. The plane slid off the runway, over a major highway, and ploughed into a warehouse, killing all 186 on board as well as several on the ground. It was Brazil's worst aviation disaster.

See also
Air brake (aircraft)

References

Spoiler
Aircraft wing components